Luc Van den Brande (born 13 October 1945) is a Flemish politician, member of the CD&V and was Minister-president of Flanders from 21 January 1992 until 13 July 1999. He took the initiative to create the Flanders Institute for Biotechnology (VIB). On 6 February 2008 he became President of the European Union's Committee of the Regions for a period of two years.

Studies 
 Doctor in Law (KUL) (1969)
 Licence of Notary (KUL) (1969)
 Lawyer, Mechelen Bar (1970–1988)

Political career

Parliamentarian mandates 
 Member of the Belgian House of Representatives for the district of Mechelen (1977–1991)
 Leader of the Christian Democratic group CVP (1985–1988)
 Member of the Council of Culture and the Flemish Council (12 May 1977 – 21 May 1995)
 Senator for the district of Mechelen-Turnhout (1991–1995)
 Member of the Flemish Parliament for Mechelen-Turnhout (13 June 1995 – 4 July 1995) (16 July 1999–)
 President of the Commission for Foreign and European Affairs (1999–2004)
 Member of the Flemish Parliament for the province of Antwerp since June 2004
 Community Senator (13 October 1999–)
 Member of the Federal advisory Committee on European Affairs

Governmental functions 
 Federal Minister of Employment and Labour (9 May 1988 – 21 January 1992)
 President of the Government of Flanders and Minister for Economic Affairs, Small and Medium-Sized Business, Science Policy, Energy and Foreign Relations (21 January 1992 – 30 January 1992)
 Minister-President of the Government of Flanders and Minister for Economic Affairs, Small and Medium-Sized Business, Science Policy, Energy and Foreign Relations (30 January 1992 – 20 June 1995)
 Minister-President of the Government of Flanders, Minister for Foreign Policy, European Affairs, Science and Technology (20 June 1995 – 13 July 1999)

European mandates and responsibilities 
 Member of the Bureau of the Assembly of European Regions (1992–1994)
 Vice-president (1994–1996) and president (1996–2000) of the Assembly of European Regions
 Member of the Committee of the Regions (since 1994)
 Vice-president of the Committee of the Regions (1994–1998) (2000–2002) – Head of the Belgian delegation (2002–2006)
 First Vice-president of the Committee of the Regions (2006–2008)
 President of the Committee of the Regions of the EU (2008–)
 Leader of the Christian Democratic Group in the Advisory Inter-parliamentary Council of the Benelux countries (2000–2008 )

Council of Europe 
 Effective member of the Parliamentary Assembly of the Council of Europe (2001–)
 Vice-president of the Parliamentary Assembly (2003–2004)
 President of the Group EPP/CD in the Parliamentary Assembly (2005–) and thus also member of the Presidential Committee, the Bureau and the Standing Committee
 Effective member of the Political Affaires Committee and the Committee on the Honouring of obligations and commitments by member states, known as the Monitoring Committee;
 Member of various subcommittees
 Several times rapporteur on various occasions, e.g. monitoring of Turkey and the Russian Federation
 Leader of the observatory delegation for the legislative elections and of ad hoc committees
 Representative of the Parliamentarian Assembly at the Committee of Ministers for the negotiations concerning the MOU between the Council and the UE
 President of the Council for Democratic Elections of the Venice Commission

Western European Union 
 Effective member of the Assembly of the Western European Union (2001–2009)

Other representations 
 Co-President of the Euro-Mediterranean Regional and Local Assembly (ARLEM)(2010–)
 Extraordinary Professor on Politic institutions – KU Leuven (2000–2005)
 President Flanders Technology International
 President Lemmens Institute
 President International Association Anton van Wilderode

Political and social interest 
 General politics, economic, scientific and technological policies, State reforms, European and foreign policy

Honours 
 2007 : Knight Grand Cross in the Order of Leopold II.
 1999 : Grand Officer in the Order of Leopold.

References

External links

 CV of Luc Van den Brande on Belgian Senate website

1945 births
Christian Democratic and Flemish politicians
Living people
Members of the Belgian Federal Parliament
Ministers-President of Flanders
Politicians from Mechelen
Belgian Roman Catholics
Recipients of the Grand Cross of the Order of Leopold II
Presidents of the European Committee of the Regions